Section 9 of the Constitution Act, 1867 is a provision of the Constitution of Canada which vests the executive power in the monarch. 

The Constitution Act, 1867 is the constitutional statute which established Canada.  Originally named the British North America Act, 1867, the Act continues to be the foundational statute for the Constitution of Canada, although it has been amended many times since 1867.  It is now recognised as part of the supreme law of Canada.

Constitution Act, 1867

The Constitution Act, 1867 is part of the Constitution of Canada and thus part of the supreme law of Canada.  It was the product of extensive negotiations by the governments of the British North American provinces in the 1860s. The Act sets out the constitutional framework of Canada, including the structure of the federal government and the powers of the federal government and the provinces.  Originally enacted in 1867 by the British Parliament under the name the British North America Act, 1867, in 1982 the Act was brought under full Canadian control through the Patriation of the Constitution, and was renamed the Constitution Act, 1867.  Since Patriation the Act can only be amended in Canada, under the amending formula set out in the Constitution Act, 1982.

Text of section 9 

Section 9 reads:

Section 9 is found in Part III of the Constitution Act, 1867, dealing with executive power of the federal government.  It has not been amended since the Act was enacted in 1867.

Purpose and interpretation

Confederation Debates
John A. Macdonald, co-premier of Canada West (now Ontario) and one of the delegates to the Quebec Conference, explained this provision during the Confederation Debates in the Parliament of the Province of Canada.  Commenting on the desirability of maintaining the British connection, he stated:

Other supporters of Confederation also spoke in favour of the monarchical principle, such as Sir Étienne Taché, the co-premier for Canada East (now Quebec):  "If we desired to remain British and monarchical, and if we desired to pass to our children these advantages, this measure [Confederation] was a necessity."  George-Étienne Cartier, one of the leading Bleus in support of Confederation, said:  "In this country of British North America we should have a distinct form of government, the characteristic of which would be to possess the monarchical element."

Support for the monarchical principle was not, however, unanimous in the Confederation Debates.  Jean-Baptiste-Éric Dorion, a Rouge member of the Opposition, spoke against it, advocating that the new constitution should be republican in nature, similar to the American constitution:

Constitutional effect
By maintaining the monarch as the head of the executive, section 9 continued all of the royal prerogative powers of the monarch with respect to executive powers, as well as aspects of the prerogative relating to the operation of government, such as the power to appoint ministries, summon or dissolve Parliament, and call elections.  Those powers are exercised on the advice of the elected government, under the principles of responsible government.

Related provisions
The Preamble to the Act affirms that Canada is to be federally united "under the Crown of the United Kingdom of Great Britain and Ireland, with a Constitution similar in principle to that of the United Kingdom".

References 

Constitution of Canada
Canadian Confederation
Federalism in Canada